The towns and cities of New York's Capital District were created by the U.S. state of New York as municipalities in order to give residents more direct say over local government. The Capital District is an 11 county area, which consists of the counties of Albany, Schenectady, Rensselaer, Saratoga, Schoharie, Warren, Washington, Columbia, Montgomery, Fulton, and Greene. New York experimented with different types of municipalities before settling upon the current format of towns and cities occupying all the land in a county. Districts were created for Albany and Tryon counties in 1772; all were transformed into towns (or divided into multiple towns) in 1788 when all of the state of New York was divided into towns. Two years before that, in 1786, all of what Washington County encompassed at that time was divided into townships with the same legal status, abilities, and responsibilities as districts with their status as towns confirmed in 1788. Some other forms of government in earlier years included land patents with some municipal rights and boroughs. The following timelines show the creation of the current towns from their predecessors stretching back to the earliest municipal entity over the area. The timelines only represent from which town(s) a particular town was created from and does not represent annexations of territory to and from towns that already existed. All municipalities are towns unless otherwise noted as patent, township, borough, district, or city. Unless otherwise sourced with a footnote all dates of incorporation represent those stated in the 1860 Gazetteer of the State of New York by John H. French.

Albany and Rensselaer counties, with Niskayuna (Schenectady County)

Notes

Schoharie and Greene counties, with Duanesburgh (Schenectady County)

Notes

[2] = A part of Albany County until 1798, then part of Ulster County until 1800 when Greene County was formed.

[9] = A part of Ulster County.
[10] = A part of Ulster County until 1800 when Greene County was formed.

Schenectady County, except Niskayuna and Duanesburgh

Notes

Saratoga County, and Easton (Washington County)

Notes

Washington County, except Easton

Notes

Warren County

Notes

[3] = A part of Washington County until 1813 when Warren County was formed.
[4] = A part of Warren County.

Columbia County

Notes

Fulton, Montgomery, and Hamilton counties, with part of Herkimer County

See also
List of incorporated places in New York's Capital District
Toponymies of places in New York's Capital District
Administrative divisions of New York
List of cities in New York
List of towns in New York
List of villages in New York
Timeline of town creation in Downstate New York
Timeline of town creation in the Hudson Valley
Timeline of town creation in Central New York

Notes

a.  Though many sources put Pittstown as incorporated as a township by patent on July 23, 1721 no law can be found incorporating it as such.  When Albany County was divided into districts Pittstown is not mentioned, though the land it currently occupies was included in Schaghticoke; if Pittstown had been a municipality it ceased to be so in 1772 (or earlier); the current town of Pittstown was formed in 1788.

References
 Gazetteer of the State of New York By John H. French 1860; R. Pearsall Smith, publisher.

Further reading
The Districts of Albany County, New York, 1772-1784 a graphical representation of French's 1860 Gazetter of the State of New York put into maps.
Welcome to the Columbia County, NY a source listing the original land disbursements (patents) in Columbia County and subsequent town creation.

Capital District (New York)
History of New York (state)
 
Former municipalities in New York (state)